Pat Kinsella (born 8 November 1943) is an English footballer, who played as a midfielder in the Football League for Tranmere Rovers and Stockport County. He also appeared in the EFL Cup for Wrexham.

References

External links

Tranmere Rovers F.C. players
Liverpool F.C. players
Bangor City F.C. players
Wrexham A.F.C. players
Rhyl F.C. players
English Football League players
Association football midfielders
1943 births
Living people
English footballers
Footballers from Liverpool
Stockport County F.C. players